The , also known as  and , took place in May and July 1868, when the Japanese capital of Edo (modern Tokyo), controlled by the Tokugawa shogunate, fell to forces favorable to the restoration of Emperor Meiji during the Boshin War.

Saigō Takamori, leading the victorious imperial forces north and east through Japan, had won the Battle of Kōshū-Katsunuma in the approaches to the capital. He was eventually able to surround Edo in May 1868.

Katsu Kaishū, the shōguns Army Minister, negotiated the surrender, which was unconditional.

Some groups continued to resist after this formal surrender but were defeated in the Battle of Ueno in northeastern Tokyo, on 4 July 1868. The city was fully under control in July 1868. During that time, Tokugawa Yoshinobu had been under voluntary confinement at Kan'ei-ji temple.

On 3 September 1868, the city was renamed Tokyo ("Eastern capital"), and the Meiji Emperor moved his capital to Tokyo, electing residence in Edo Castle, today's Imperial Palace.

A small monument has been erected at the location of the surrender meeting between Saigō Takamori and Katsu Kaishū, at Minato-ku, Shiba 5-33-1.

Cultural depictions
The Fall of Edo was depicted in various films and television series:

Film
Edojō Sōzeme (1930, dir. Seika Shiba)
Edo Saigo no Hi (1941, dir. Hiroshi Inagaki)
Dai Tokyo Tanjō Ōedo no Kane (1958, dir. Tatsuyasu Ōsone)

Television drama
Taiga drama
San Shimai (1967), 5th taiga drama
Katsu Kaishū (1974), 12th taiga drama
Tobu ga Gotoku (1990), 28th taiga drama
Tokugawa Yoshinobu (1998); 37th taiga drama
Atsuhime (2008); 47th taiga drama
Segodon (2018); 57th taiga drama
Other
Ōoku (2003)

Notes

References
Jansen, Marius B. (2000). The Making of Modern Japan. Cambridge: Harvard University Press. ;  OCLC 44090600
Kornicki, Peter. (1998). Meiji Japan: Political, Economic and Social History, 1868–1912. London: Routledge. ; ; ; ; ;  OCLC 470242993
Perkins, Dorothy. (1997). Japan Goes to War: a Chronology of Japanese Military Expansion from the Meiji Era to the Attack on Pearl Harbor (1868–1941). Upland, Pennsylvania: Diane. OCLC 638765414

1868 in Japan
Boshin War
Conflicts in 1868
Sieges involving Japan